Every Second In Between is the fifth album by American singer-songwriter Lili Añel. Añel took measures to make sure the album was properly promoted this time around by hiring the services of a publicity firm. This resulted in television appearances on NBC, along with numerous reviews and radio airplay.

Track listing
I Don’t Need You This Way – 4:37
One More Night – 4:23
Supposed To Be – 3:46
That's All I Want from You – 4:21
So Far Away' – 4:40
Can’t Fall Out of Love" – 3:43
Much To My Surprise – 4:21 
George Bailey’s Lament" – 3:10
Won’t You Stay – 4:14 
Voyager – 4:52 
Goodbye – 3:27

All compositions by Lili Añel except:
"That's All I Want from You" by Fritz Roter
"So Far Away" by Lili Añel and Barbara Añel

Personnel
Musicians
Lili Añel — vocals, guitars
Joel Bryant — Wurlitzer, Rhodes Piano, Hammond B3
Mayra Casales — percussion
John Conahan – piano, arrangements, string arrangement "Voyager" and "That’s All I Want from You"; vocals on "So Far Away" and "Much to My Surprise"
Chico Huff – electric bass, upright bass
Jef Lee Johnson – guitar, mandolin
Grant Macavoy – drums
Naomi Grey - cello on "That's All I Want from You"
Glenn Barratt – guitar on "So Far Away", "Much to My Surprise", "Won't You Stay"
Erik Mitchell – vocals "Much to My Surprise"
Gary Schreiner – chromatic harmonica on "Can't Fall Out of Love"
String quartet on "Voyager"
Michelle Bishop, violin
Eliza Cho, violin
Jenny Lorenzo, cello
Engineers
Glenn Barratt
Dave Gearhart
Dave Schonauer

References

2009 albums
Lili Añel albums